Veto is the seventh studio album by German extreme metal band Heaven Shall Burn, released on 19 April 2013 through Century Media Records. The album entered the US Top Heatseekers albums at No. 14 selling 1,175 copies in the first week.

Track listing

Personnel
Production and performance credits are adapted from the album liner notes.

 Heaven Shall Burn
 Marcus Bischoff – vocals
 Alexander Dietz – guitars, producer, engineer
 Maik Weichert – guitars, co-producer
 Eric Bischoff – bass
 Matthias Voigt – drums

Additional musicians
 René Liedtke – additional lead and solo guitars on "Valhalla" and "Beyond Redemption", choir on "Valhalla"
 Alexander Klopp – solo guitars on "Land of the Upright Ones", choir on "Valhalla"
 Ralf Klein – solo guitars on "Land of the Upright Ones", choir on "Valhalla"
 Rob Franssen (Born from Pain) – chorus vocals, backing vocals on "Die Stürme rufen Dich"
 Dominik Stammen (Born from Pain) – chorus vocals, backing vocals on "Die Stürme rufen Dich"
 Hansi Kürsch (Blind Guardian) – guest vocals on "Valhalla", choir on "Valhalla"
 Dan Wilding (Carcass) – additional percussion and drums
 Katharina Radig – vocals on "European Super State", choir on "Valhalla"
 Benjamin Mahnert – choir on "Valhalla"
 Elsterglanz – choir on "Valhalla"
 Patrick W. Engel – choir on "Valhalla"

Production
 Tue Madsen – mixing, mastering
 Patrick Wittstock – design, layout
 John Collier – front cover

Production (500.Live)
 Lars Dietrich – live recording
 Sebastian "Seeb" Levermann – live recording
 Alexander Dietz – mixing, mastering
 Christian Thiele – photography

Production (Blizzard Over England Mix)
 Colin Richardson – mixing, mastering
 Carl Bown – mixing engineer

Release history

Chart performance

References

External links 

2013 albums
Century Media Records albums
Heaven Shall Burn albums